Macrophage migration inhibitory factor (MIF), also known as glycosylation-inhibiting factor (GIF), L-dopachrome isomerase, or phenylpyruvate tautomerase is a protein that in humans is encoded by the MIF gene. MIF is an important regulator of innate immunity. The MIF protein superfamily also includes a second member with functionally related properties, the D-dopachrome tautomerase (D-DT). CD74 is a surface receptor for MIF.

Bacterial antigens stimulate white blood cells to release MIF into the blood stream. The circulating MIF binds to CD74 on other immune cells to trigger an acute immune response. Hence, MIF is classified as an inflammatory cytokine. Furthermore, glucocorticoids also stimulate white blood cells to release MIF and hence MIF partially counteracts the inhibitory effects that glucocorticoids have on the immune system. Finally trauma activates the anterior pituitary gland to release MIF.

Structure 
Macrophage migration inhibitory factor assembles into a trimer composed of three identical subunits.  Each of these monomers contain two antiparallel alpha helices and a four-stranded beta sheet.  The monomers surround a central channel with 3-fold rotational symmetry.

Response to injury 
Cytokines play an important role in promoting wound healing and tissue repair. Cell injury results in MIF release which then interacts with CD74. MIF-CD74 signaling activates pro-survival and proliferative pathways that protects the host during injury.

Enzymatic activity 
MIF contains two motifs with catalytic activity. The first is a 27 amino acid motif located at the N-terminus functions as a phenylpyruvate tautomerase that can catalyze the conversion of 2-carboxy-2,3-dihydroindole-5,6-quinone (dopachrome) into 5,6-dihydroxyindole-2-carboxylic acid (DHICA). MIF also contains a Cys-Ala-Leu-Cys catalytic site between residues 57 and 60 that appears to function as a disulfide reductase.

Function 
This gene encodes a lymphokine involved in cell-mediated immunity, immunoregulation, and inflammation. MIF plays a role in the regulation of macrophage function in host defense through the suppression of anti-inflammatory effects of glucocorticoids. This lymphokine and the JAB1 protein form a complex in the cytosol near the peripheral plasma membrane, which may indicate a role in integrin signaling pathways.

Mechanism of action 
MIF binds to CD74, inducing its phosphorylation and the recruitment of CD44 which then activates non-receptor tyrosine kinases, leading ultimately to extracellular signal-regulated kinase phosphorylation. In addition to ERK, stimulation of CD74 activates other signaling pathways such PI3K-Akt, NF-κB, and AMP-activated protein kinase (AMPK) pathways.

Interactions 
Macrophage migration inhibitory factor has been reported to interact with:
 BNIPL,
 CD74,
 COPS5,
 CXCR4, and
RPS19.

Clinical significance 
MIF is a potential drug target for sepsis, rheumatoid arthritis, and cancer.

Parasite-produced MIF homologs  

Multiple protozoan parasites produce homologs MIF that have similar inflammatory functions to human MIF, and play a role in their pathogenesis, invasion and immune evasion. A preclinical study showed that blocking parasite MIF improves outcome in severe protozoan infections. Examples of protozoans with MIF homologs that have been reported:

 Entamoeba histolytica,
 Plasmodium falciparum,
 Toxoplasma gondii,
 Leishmania, 
Trichomonas vaginalis.

References

External links 

Immune system